The 1986 OFC Women's Championship was the second OFC Women's Championship of women's association football (also known as the OFC Women's Nations Cup). It took place in Christchurch, New Zealand from 29 March to 5 April 1986. Four teams participated in the tournament, and a total of eight matches were played.

Chinese Taipei defeated Australia 4–1 in the final to win the second edition of the tournament. Defending champions New Zealand finished third, after winning to their B-side in penalty shoot-outs.

Teams 
The following four teams participated in the tournament:

 (withdrew)
 New Zealand B entered following the late withdrawal of Papua New Guinea.

Results

First round

Third place play-off

Final

Awards

Statistics

Goalscorers
3 goals
 Liu Yu-chu
2 goals

 Chou Tai-ying
 Wendy Sharpe

1 goal

 Renaye Iserief
 Andrea Martin
 Sharon Mateljan
 Sue Monteath
 Yang Hsiu-chih
 Hsie Hsiu-min
 Ma Wei-chiu
 Maureen Jacobson
 Jo Bradley (for New Zealand B)

Overall ranking

External links 
 OFC Site
 RSSSF

1986
OFC
Women
1986
1986 in New Zealand association football
1986 in Australian soccer
March 1986 sports events in New Zealand
April 1986 sports events in New Zealand
Sport in Christchurch